Ernest Peter Jones (born 30 November 1937) is an English former footballer who played as a full-back.

References

External links
Profile at StretfordEnd.co.uk
Profile at MUFCInfo.com
Profile at The Post War English & Scottish Football League A – Z Player's Transfer Database

1937 births
Living people
English footballers
Association football defenders
Wolverhampton Wanderers F.C. players
Manchester United F.C. players
Wrexham A.F.C. players
Stockport County F.C. players
Altrincham F.C. players